Morton is a hamlet near the village of Calthwaite, in the civil parishes of Hesket and Skelton, within the Eden district of the English county of Cumbria.

References 

Philip's Street Atlas (page 55)

Hamlets in Cumbria
Eden District
Skelton, Cumbria